Kenneth Waller (5 November 1927 – 28 January 2000) was an English actor.  He was known for portraying Grandad in Bread and Old Mr. Grace in Are You Being Served?

Early life
Kenneth Waller was born in Lowerhouses Huddersfield, Yorkshire on 5 November 1927. In 1931 during the depression, he moved to Hythe, Hampshire in the New Forest and they were living there at the breakout of World War II. In 1940 his family returned to his native Huddersfield.Huddersfield Daily Examiner - 27 February 1989 Waller left school aged 16 and worked as a wages clerk until being called up for National Service.

In 1949, he was a member of the Christ Church Woodhouse men's choir.

After serving in the Royal Air Force as a Radar Mechanic, Waller worked for a firm of auctioneers.

Career

Experience in local rep at the Oxford Playhouse encouraged him to move to London, where he made his West End debut in Julian Slade and Dorothy Reynolds' 1957 musical Free as Air.  He was later in the original cast of Give a Dog a Bone in 1964, and took over various roles in various other London productions such as Salad Days and Anne of Green Gables: The Musical.  Waller was also associated the Open Air Theatre, Regent's Park, but always looked forward to the times when his work took him on location further afield, including Rome, India and Scandinavia.

An excellent pianist and an ardent lover of classical and choral music, Waller was extremely knowledgeable on the subject of oratorio and sang with Anthony Bowles' Actors' choir and the BBC Chorus.  He also appeared as the Narrator in Peter and the Wolf, and Carl Davis wrote a special concert piece, "Duck's Diary," for him.

From the fifties to the seventies, his career as an actor saw him appear on both television and film.  On the big screen, he had modest roles in Room at the Top (1959), Chitty Chitty Bang Bang (1968), Scrooge (1970), Fiddler on the Roof (1971) and Carry On Behind (1975).  Other small screen credits included Big Deal, Crossroads, The Fenn Street Gang, Dixon of Dock Green, Z-Cars, The Professionals, Doctor Who, All Creatures Great and Small, Terry and June and  Juliet Bravo. Waller also portrayed the father of Curly Watts in Coronation Street.

In 1981, he joined the cast of Are You Being Served? as Old Mr. Grace.

Waller also made an appearance in the Series 5 episode, "Boxing Day Social", on On the Buses, as well appearing in the 1984 miniseries, Ellis Island and even lending his voice for Romuald the Reindeer.

In 1986, Waller became a household name as Grandad in Carla Lane's Liverpool sitcom, Bread and his catchphrase, "Where's my tea?", quickly caught on with the viewing public.

Waller continued to stay in touch with the theatre during the final years of his life, touring successfully with Barbara Windsor in Joe Orton's classic black comedy, Entertaining Mr Sloane and appearing in a musical version of Beauty and the Beast at the Manchester Opera House, in 1998.

Personal life and death
Despite his television fame, Waller never lost his affection for Yorkshire, taking great pride in retaining both his accent and his many friends within the Huddersfield Choral Society.

Kenneth Waller died on 28 January 2000 in London, England at the age of 72, after a brief illness. He never married.

Filmography

Z-Cars (1963-1977, TV Series) - Wilfred Wilson / Pianist / Fred Jones / Stanley Collins
Room at the Top (1959) - Reggie (uncredited)
Crossroads (1964, TV Series) - Mr. Hardgreaves
Mr. Brown Comes Down the Hill (1965) - Journalist / Patron of the Bar
A Game of Murder (1966, TV Series) - Dr. Hasting
Chitty Chitty Bang Bang (1968) - Inventor #4
Softly, Softly (1970, TV Series) - Potter
Scrooge (1970) - Party Guest (uncredited)
The Onedin Line (1971, TV Series) - Drayman
On the Buses (1971, TV Series) - Busman
Fiddler on the Roof (1971) - (uncredited)
The Love Pill (1972) - Professor Edwards
Dixon of Dock Green (1972-1974, TV Series) - Dealer / Porter
Menace (1973, TV Series) - Manager
Doctor on the Go (1975, TV Series) - Mr. Pole
Carry On Behind (1975) - Barman
The Venetian Twins (1976, TV Movie)
Doctor Who (1977, Episode: "The Invisible Enemy") - Hedges
Target (1977, TV Series) - Warehouse Transport Manager
The Mayor of Casterbridge (1978, TV Mini-Series) - Clerk of Court
The Famous Five (1978, TV Series) - Enemy Agent
All Creatures Great and Small (1980, TV Series) - Mr. Ronald Beresford
Are You Being Served? (1981, TV Series) - Old Mr. Henry Grace
Juliet Bravo (1982, TV Series) - Sidney Dorkins
Fair Ground! (1983, TV Series) - Mr. Grant
Minder (1984, TV Series) - Roland
Ellis Island (1984, TV Mini-Series) - Shepherd #1
Big Deal (1984-1986, TV Series) - Ferret
The Optimist (1985, TV Series) - Solicitor
Roll Over Beethoven (1985, TV Series) - Mr. Beckett
The Pickwick Papers (1985, TV Series) - Fogg
The Beiderbecke Affair "Harry the Supergrass" (1985)
Bread (1986-1991, TV Series) - Grandad
Boon (1987, TV Series) - Mr. Newell
Coronation Street (1988, TV Series) - Arthur Watts, Curly Watts's father
Romuald the Reindeer (1996, TV Series) - Grandpa Ivy (voice)

References

External links

1927 births
2000 deaths
English male television actors
English male voice actors
Male actors from Huddersfield
20th-century English male actors
20th-century Royal Air Force personnel